Skelley is both a surname and a given name. Notable people with the name include:

 Arrin Skelley (born 1966), American voice actor
 Chris Skelley (born 1993), English Paralympic judoka
 Dana Skelley, British civil engineer
 John Skelley (1918–1971), Australian rules footballer
 Skelley Adu Tutu (born 1979), Ghanaian footballer

See also

Skelly (disambiguation)